The Self-portrait of Giorgione is a possible self-portrait by the Italian painter Giorgione, now in the Museum of Fine Arts in Budapest. It is not universally accepted as an autograph work but – if it is – it is thought to be based on the c.1509-1510 Self-portrait as David now in the Herzog Anton Ulrich Museum.

It was stolen on 5 November 1983. It was recovered in Operation Budapest.

1510 paintings
Giorgione
Stolen works of art
16th-century portraits
Paintings in the collection of the Museum of Fine Arts (Budapest)
Paintings by Giorgione